Parliamentary elections were held in Armenia on 12 May 2007. 1,364 candidates ran for the 131 seats, 41 of which were constituency seats with the remaining 90 being filled by a proportional party-list system. The electoral threshold was five per cent.

Results
The BBC reported a turnout of over 60%. The Organization for Security and Co-operation in Europe judged the elections to have "demonstrated improvement" over previous parliamentary elections, but said "the stated intention by the Armenian authorities to conduct an election in line with OSCE commitments and international standards was not fully realized."

Critics and opposition politicians had announced their fears that the polls would not be democratic, despite officials' reassurances that the changes to the voting laws would ensure a more democratic election than the greatly criticised 2003 one.

References

External links

Center for Regional Development / Transparency International Armenia Election Monitor

Armenia
Parliamentary election
Parliamentary elections in Armenia
Armenian election
2000s in Armenian politics